The Jim Thorpe Lifetime Achievement Award is the highest award presented by the Jim Thorpe Association. Without consideration of athletic accomplishments, the award recognizes a lifetime of achievement by people who "set the living examples that influence others to strive for the highest goals and leadership of men, and who blaze the trails of accomplishments which leave behind the pathways of tradition for others to follow."

Only seven people have received this award since the association was founded in 1986.

Lifetime Achievement Award winners
1989 – Abe Lemons
1992 – George Nigh
1993 – Allie Reynolds
1999 – Chris Schenkel
2000 – Tom Osborne
2002 – Lynne Draper
2004 – Barry Switzer

Footnotes

External links
Lifetime Achievement Award. The Jim Thorpe Association and Oklahoma Sports Hall of Fame official website

Lifetime achievement awards
American sports trophies and awards
Awards established in 1989